Wankendorf is a municipality in the district of Plön, in Schleswig-Holstein, Germany. It is situated approximately 24 km south of Kiel.

Wankendorf is the seat of the Amt ("collective municipality") Bokhorst-Wankendorf.

References

Plön (district)